Stephen Herbert Langdon (1876May 19, 1937) was an American-born British Assyriologist.  Born to George Knowles and Abigail Hassinger Langdon in Monroe, Michigan, Langdon studied at the University of Michigan, participating in Phi Beta Kappa and earning an A. B. in 1898 and an A. M. in 1899.  Following this he went to New York's Union Theological Seminary, graduating in 1903, and then on to Columbia University to obtain a Ph.D. in 1904.  Langdon then became a fellow of Columbia in France (1904-1906), during which time he was ordained as a deacon of the Church of England (1905) in Paris.  Subsequently, he moved to Oxford University in England (where he was a member of the Jesus College Senior Common Room though not a Fellow), becoming a Shillito reader in Assyriology in 1908, a British citizen in 1913, and after the retirement of Archibald Sayce, a Professor of Assyriology in 1919.  However, in 1916, when World War I had diminished the size of his classes in England, he spent some time at the University of Pennsylvania Museum of Archaeology and Anthropology, serving as the curator of its Babylonian section.

Works
 (Ph.D. thesis)

 Internet Archive

 (also Paris: P. Geuthner)

 (with L. Ch. Watelin)

 (with J.K. Fotheringham)

 (also New York: Cooper Square Publishers, 1964)

Further reading

References

External links

 
 

1876 births
1937 deaths
American Assyriologists
English Assyriologists
University of Michigan alumni
People associated with Jesus College, Oxford